Mayar is a Pashtun tribe in Khyber Pakhtunkhwa and in some parts of Afghanistan. 
People belong to Mayar Tribe mostly living in Mardan, Katlang, Upper Dir and In Bajorh Agency.
There are two places Named Mayar in Pakistan where most Mayar People are living and those are Mayar Mardan, Mayar Katlang.

People

Given name
 Mayar Hany, Egyptian squash player
 Mayar Sherif, Egyptian tennis player

Surname
 Harsh Mayar, Indian actor
 Himayat Ullah Mayar, Pakistani politician
 Ubaid Ullah Mayar, Pakistani politician
 Abdurahman Mayar, Afghani Taoiseach

Places
 Mayar, Mardan, Khyber Pakhtunkhwa, Pakistan
 Mayar, Lower Dir, Khyber Pakhtunkhwa, Pakistan
 Mayar (mountain), Angus, Scotland
 Mayar Khil (village), Chak District, Wardak province, Afghanistan

Other
 Mayar Badhon, 1997 Bengali film